Damua is a census town in Chhindwara district in the state of Madhya Pradesh, India.

Demographics
 India census, Damua had a population of 15,856. Males constitute 52% of the population and females 48%. Damua has an average literacy rate of 73%, higher than the national average of 59.5%: male literacy is 79% and, female literacy is 66%. In Damua, 10% of the population is under 6 years of age.

Damua has now declared as a new municipality in Chhindwara. Damua is a basically divided in three parts.
 Nandan (Kalichhapar)
 Nandora
 Chikatbary

Schools in Damua and Nandan
 Govt Higher Secondary School, Nandan.
 Govt boys school, Damua.
 Govt Girls school, Damua.
L.B.S High school English medium Nandan.

Nearest park and hill station from Damua.
 Satpuda national park.(panchmarhi). Panchmarhi Satpuda park.
 Pench national park (Seoni, Chhindwara)

Town in Damua Range 
1. Damua
2. Nandan
3. Kalichhapar
4. Chikatbary
5. Gop.
6. Dhahu
7. Kangla Bhakra
8. Raijamun
9. Rakhikol
and various small towns in Damua and Nandan range.

Nearest Railway Station
Hirdhagrah & Junnardeo

Ghoradongri (Nagpur-itarsi section)

River
Kanhan River

Famous Temple
Shidhnath Dham (sidhbaba tekri), Khedapati mata mandir

Media

Newspapers:
Damua's local News paper is Khan Majdoor
Chhindwara has a few print publications which include Hindi newspapers such as, Dainik Bhaskar, Lokmat Samachar, Patrika, Jabalpur Express, Divya Express.

Radio:
There are few FM stations broadcasting from Chhindwara: Vividh Bharati and Gyan Vani.

Transport
The nearest airport is Jabalpur.

See also
 Kamalnath

References

Sources 

 www.damuacity.hpage.com

External links
Official website

Cities and towns in Chhindwara district